Kara Anne Swisher is an American journalist. She has covered the business of the internet since 1994. As of 2022, Swisher was a contributing editor at New York Magazine, the host of the podcast Sway, and the co-host of the podcast Pivot.

In 2014 she co-founded Vox Media's Recode. From 2018 to 2022, she was an opinion writer for The New York Times, before re-joining Vox Media. She has also written for The Wall Street Journal, The Washington Post, the All Things Digital conference and the online publication All Things D. A self-described "liberal, lesbian Donald Trump of San Francisco", in 2016 she expressed interest in running for political office in San Francisco.

Early life and education
Swisher lived in Roslyn Harbor, New York until her father died when she was five years old. Afterward her family moved to Princeton, New Jersey where she was raised. In a 2021 interview with Bryan Elliott (journalist) for Inc.'s Behind The Brand, Swisher stated that, as a child, she always wanted to work either in the military, with military intelligence, or with the CIA.

She wrote for The Hoya, Georgetown's school newspaper, and later left that paper to write for The Georgetown Voice, the university's news magazine.

Swisher received her BS in literature and journalism from the Edmund A. Walsh School of Foreign Service (SFS) at Georgetown University in Washington D.C. in 1984. Just one year later in 1985, she received her MS in journalism from Columbia University Graduate School of Journalism.

After the fall of the Berlin Wall, Swisher obtained external funding through a fellowship to fund living almost a year in Kreuzberg, Berlin. Preparing for future employment within  "the security apparatus", she attempted to learn German, but never mastered the language.

Career
Swisher worked at the Washington City Paper in Washington, D.C. She interned at The Washington Post in 1986 and was later hired full-time.

The Wall Street Journal
Swisher joined The Wall Street Journal in 1997, working from its bureau in San Francisco. She created and wrote Boom Town, a column devoted to the companies, personalities and culture of Silicon Valley which appeared on the front page of the Wall Street Journal's Marketplace section and online. During that period, she was cited as the most influential reporter covering the Internet by Industry Standard magazine.

In 2003, with her colleague Walt Mossberg, she launched the All Things Digital conference and later expanded it into a daily blog called AllThingsD.com. The conference featured interviews by Swisher and Mossberg of top technology executives, such as Bill Gates, Steve Jobs, and Larry Ellison, all of whom appeared on stage without prepared remarks or slides.

Books
She is the author of aol.com: How Steve Case Beat Bill Gates, Nailed the Netheads and Made Millions in the War for the Web, published by Times Business Print Books in July 1998. The sequel, There Must Be a Pony in Here Somewhere: The AOL Time Warner Debacle and the Quest for a Digital Future, was published in the fall of 2003 by Crown Business Print Books. In 2021, it was announced that she signed a two-book memoir deal with Simon & Schuster.

Recode
On January 1, 2014, Swisher and Mossberg struck out on their own with the Recode website, based in San Francisco. In the spring of 2014 they held the inaugural Code Conference near Los Angeles. Vox Media acquired the website in May 2015. A month later in June 2015, they launched Recode Decode, a weekly podcast in which Swisher interviews prominent figures in the technology space with Stewart Butterfield featured as the first guest.

In September 2018, Recode and Vox Media launched Pivot, a semi-weekly news commentary podcast co-hosted by Swisher and Scott Galloway.

In April 2020, New York Magazine announced Pivot would be joining the magazine's properties, subsequently dropping the Recode branding, and Swisher would also be joining as editor-at-large. In May 2020, Swisher wrote on Twitter that she had not been involved in editing or assigning stories on Recode for many years.

The New York Times 
Swisher became a contributing writer to the New York Times Opinion section in August 2018, focusing on tech. She has written about topics such as Elon Musk, Kevin Systrom's departure from Instagram, Google and censorship, and an internet Bill of Rights.

In September 2020, the Times premiered Sway, a semiweekly podcast hosted by Swisher focused on the subject of power and those who wield it, with Nancy Pelosi featured as her first guest. Other guests have included Georgia politician and voting rights activist Stacey Abrams, Airbnb CEO Brian Chesky, actor Sacha Baron Cohen, Apple CEO Tim Cook, entrepreneur Mark Cuban, Microsoft co-founder and philanthropist Bill Gates, former Presidential candidate Senator Amy Klobuchar (D-MN), United States Secretary of Transportation Pete Buttigieg, film director Spike Lee, Parler CEO John Matze, Georgia Secretary of State Brad Raffensberger, USSF CSO Gen. John W. Raymond, and social activist and celebrity Monica Lewinsky.

Other activities
Swisher has also served as a judge for Mayor Michael Bloomberg's NYC BigApps competition in New York.

Swisher told Rolling Stone writer Claire Hoffman: "A lot of these people I cover are babies", Swisher says. "I always call them papier-mâché – they just wilt."

In 2016, Swisher announced she planned to run for mayor of San Francisco as a Democrat in 2023. She was then described as likely to run on a "highly progressive" platform.

Swisher wrote of her experiences working for The McLaughlin Group in a 2018 Slate article, in which she alleged that host John McLaughlin abused staff and sexually harassed women. Reflecting on his death from prostate cancer in 2016, she wrote, "I’m so glad he’s dead. Seriously, I’m glad he’s dead. He was a jackass. He deserved it."

In January 2019, Swisher told people who disapproved of a Gillette advertisement, following the January 2019 Lincoln Memorial confrontation "And to all you aggrieved folks who thought this Gillette ad was too much bad-men-shaming, after we just saw it come to life with those awful kids and their fetid smirking harassing that elderly man on the Mall: Go fuck yourselves." Citing Swisher's comment as an example of how inaccurate many media accounts of the story had been, Caitlin Flanagan of The Atlantic Monthly observed, "You know the left has really changed in this country when you find its denizens ... lionizing the social attitudes of the corporate monolith Procter & Gamble." Swisher apologized in a follow-up tweet two days later.

In 2021, Swisher hosted the official companion podcast for the third season of HBO's TV series Succession.

Bibliography 
 aol.com: How Steve Case Beat Bill Gates, Nailed the Netheads, and Made Millions in the War for the Web. New York: Random House International, 1999. , 
 Kara Swisher; Lisa Dickey There Must Be a Pony in Here Somewhere: The AOL Time Warner Debacle and the Quest for the Digital Future New York: Three Rivers Press, 2003. ,

Personal life
Swisher has two sons with her ex-wife, former U.S. CTO and early Google executive Megan Smith. She married Amanda Katz in 2020, the couple have two children.

In 2011 Swisher suffered a "mini-stroke" while on a flight to Hong Kong, where she was subsequently hospitalized and put on anticoagulant medication. She wrote about the experience in a remembrance of Luke Perry, after a stroke led to his death in 2019.

Swisher is known for wearing dark aviator sunglasses even while indoors, explaining "I have light sensitivity a little; I just don’t like bright lights."

Swisher, who was raised Catholic, identifies as agnostic.

Awards

 2011 Gerald Loeb Award for Blogging for "Liveblogging Yahoo Earnings Calls in 2010 (They're Funny!)"
2020 Fast Company Queer 50
2021 Fast Company Queer 50
2021 American Academy of Arts and Sciences Elected member

References

External links

1963 births
Living people
20th-century American women writers
All Things Digital people
American columnists
American technology writers
Columbia University Graduate School of Journalism alumni
Walsh School of Foreign Service alumni
American lesbian writers
The Wall Street Journal people
The Washington Post people
Vanity Fair (magazine) people
Vox Media
American women columnists
Yahoo! people
American mass media company founders
American women company founders
American company founders
American Internet company founders
American podcasters
20th-century American non-fiction writers
Gerald Loeb Award winners for News Service, Online, and Blogging
American LGBT journalists
American women podcasters
21st-century American women writers
LGBT people from New York (state)
LGBT people from New Jersey
Journalists from New Jersey
California Democrats